Sydney James Van Pelt (born 1 February 1908 in Melbourne; † 7 January 1976) was an Australian medical practitioner and a pioneer of modern medical hypnosis and hypnotherapy.

Family
The son and only child of John Thomas Van Pelt (1878-1932), and Bertha Florence Van Pelt, née Reid, he was born in Windsor, Victoria on 1 February 1908.

Medicine
Graduating M.B.B.S. from the University of Melbourne in December 1933, he was appointed to the staff of The Alfred Hospital, Melbourne at the end of 1933. He served for a time in the Royal Navy, as a Surgeon Lieutenant-Commander. After the war, he had a practice in Harley Street.

Hypnotism
Having first encountered hypnotism in  Melbourne, in 1932, he was the founding editor of the British Journal of Medical Hypnotism, President of the British Society of Medical Hypnotists, and a member of the (U.S.) Society for Clinical and Experimental Hypnosis.

In 1952 he was commissioned by the British Minister of Health, the Home Office and the National Association of Mental Health to assist in the adoption of the U.K. Hypnotism Act 1952.

Publications 
 How to conquer nerves. London, Skeffington / Roy Publishers, 1954. 
 Waking hypnosis. Hove : Courtenay Press, 1954.
 Hypnotic suggestion: its role in psychoneurotic and psychosomatic disorders: A thesis. New York: Philosophical Library, 1956. 
 Modern hypnotism: key to the mind. Westport, Conn., : Associated Booksellers, 1956.
 Secrets of hypnotism. Wilshire Book Co., 1958. 
 Hypnotism and the power within. New York: Wehman Bros., 1958. 
 Hypnotism. London: W. & G. Foyle, 1960. 
 With Gordon Ambrose and George Newbold: Medical Hypnosis: New Hope For Mankind. London: Gollancz, 1953. 
New edition: Medical hypnosis handbook. Wilshire Book Co., 1965.

Footnotes

References 
 Degrees Conferred, 23 December 1933: Bachelor of Medicine and Bachelor of Surgery, Annual Report, 1933—1934, The University of Melbourne, p.1234.
 Medico-Legal: Doctors in Slander Suit, British Medical Journal, Vol.2, No.5056, (30 November 1957), pp.1313-1314. 

Australian hypnotists
 Melbourne Medical School alumni
1908 births
1976 deaths
Royal Navy Medical Service officers
People from Windsor, Victoria
Medical doctors from Melbourne
Royal Navy personnel of World War II
Military personnel from Melbourne